The men's team competition of the 2014 World Judo Championships was held on 31 August.

Medalists

Results

Repechage

Prize money
The sums listed bring the total prizes awarded to 50,000$ for the specific team event.

References

 Draw

External links
 

Men's team
World Men's Team Judo Championships
World 2014